Erdeven is a commune in the Morbihan department in the region of Brittany in north-western France. Inhabitants of Erdeven are called Erdevenois.

Its main industry is tourism. Attractions include a seven kilometre-long beach beside the Atlantic and many prehistoric sites featuring megaliths. The Mané-Croch, Mané-Bras and Crucuno dolmens and the Kerzerho alignments lie just outside the commune.

Twin towns
It is twinned with St. Märgen in the Black Forest region of Germany.

Gallery

See also
 Carnac
 Communes of the Morbihan département

References

External links

 Official commune website 
 Erdeven's Office of Tourism website 
 Cultural Heritage 
 Erdeven on bretagne.com

Archaeological sites in France
Communes of Morbihan
Megalithic monuments in France